Novara Media (often shortened to Novara) is an independent, left-wing alternative media organisation based in the United Kingdom.

Novara Media was founded in 2011 by James Butler and Aaron Bastani, who met in the same year during the protests against the increase in UK university tuition fees. Novara Media is a trading name of Thousand Hands Ltd. It has offices and studios in south-east London, and an office in Leeds.

History

Early years
Novara was founded in June 2011 by James Butler and Aaron Bastani. Butler was educated at the London Oratory School, followed by Brasenose College, Oxford from where he graduated with a degree in English. Bastani was educated at University College London. Initially, Bastani and Butler hosted an hour-long live show and podcast, called Novara FM, on community radio station Resonance FM as a kind of 'socialist night school.' The intention was to feed into the leftist movement that had resulted in the student protests. They named the show after the Italian town, Novara, in Elio Petri's 1971 film The Working Class Goes to Heaven. The venture developed into Novara Media in 2013 with the involvement of others engaged in direct action in the student movement. Novara diversified and, in addition to audio, written and video content were produced, and Novara Media established itself as a multimedia project.

Corbyn's Labour leadership 
At its inception, Novara Media's attitude towards the Labour Party "veered between sceptical and hostile – but certainly not hopeful". The media outlet's affinities, however, were drawn towards the Labour Party by the interest generated by Jeremy Corbyn's 2015 bid to be the leader of the party—unlike many within Labour, Corbyn and his allies, John McDonnell and Diane Abbott, were seen by those at Novara to be allies of extra-parliamentary political movements on the left, like those in which Novara Media's team were involved. Novara was supportive of Jeremy Corbyn's leadership of the Labour Party and obtained a July 2015 interview with Jeremy Corbyn on the day he became the bookmakers' favourite to win the 2015 Labour Party leadership election. A number of other interviews with Corbyn and McDonnell followed. Other guests on Novara included Labour Party Chairman Ian Lavery, Shadow Home Secretary Diane Abbott, the Green Party MP Caroline Lucas, and Chris Williamson. Novara offered varied perspectives on the 2016 EU membership referendum, with Bastani initially advocating the UK's withdrawal from the EU, and James Butler advocating a pro-remain argument. Novara later hosted multiple debates on Brexit related issues from a left wing viewpoint.

Following the Labour party's better-than-expected result at the 2017 general election, Novara Media, like other independent left-wing news organisations, received growing outside media interest. By this time, the organisation's YouTube videos were frequently gaining 100,000 views, and, according to its self-reported figures, it had reached 3 million Facebook users over the election period. One incident in 2018 which received particular attention was when Novara Media contributor Ash Sarkar said during a discussion on Good Morning Britain of protests against US President Donald Trump's visit to the UK that she had also criticised Barack Obama and the Democratic Party because she was 'literally a communist'. The copy of this clip on Novara's Youtube channel achieved more than 6 million views and members of Novara media's leadership team were invited on Newsnight to discuss the incident. It was also reported during 2018 that Novara staff regularly took briefings from the Labour Party via WhatsApp. During the 2019 election, Novara campaigned enthusiastically for the party, with co-founder Aaron Bastani suggesting on social media that the party's vote share would exceed 36% on the eve of the ballot, however the actual figure was 32.1%.

2020s 
After the end of Corbyn's leadership of Labour and Keir Starmer's victory in the 2020 leadership contest, Novara, like various other left-wing alternative media outlets in the UK, again took a far more critical view on the party's leadership. Bastani himself resigned from the Labour Party in February 2021.

Novara media saw significant expansion during the COVID-19 pandemic with its YouTube channel seeing an increase in subscribers from 65,000 in March 2020 to 170,000 in October 2021 and in cumulative views from 10 million a month prior to the pandemic to 40 million by autumn 2021. Research associate at the Cardiff University School of Journalism, media and culture Declan McDowell Naylor said in 2021 that out of all the alternative left-wing media organisations he had examined he believed that Novara Media had the greatest chance of surviving into the long-term but that the organisation was attempting a balancing act as "Everyone I interviewed there was talking about professionalisation and the tensions that brings with being a political project."

Editorial position
Novara has a left-wing editorial position. Bastani, one of the founders of the organisation, has frequently advocated the political idea of "fully automated luxury communism", "a political vision which advocates a transition to post-work society where abundance is held in common", or as Bastani puts it, "the full automation of everything and common ownership of that which is automated". Other contributors, notably James Butler, critiqued this idea on air, arguing that the word 'luxury' could lead to misunderstandings. Ash Sarkar has defined communism as being "about the desire to see the coercive structures of state dismantled, while also having fun".

Novara dissents from what it views as biased "mainstream media". Its staff and editorial team believe traditional media outlets express a narrow view of politics and are out of touch with a segment of the UK public, have missed a shift in the UK's political mood, and has a corrupting influence on the UK's democracy. In a 2017 Guardian article, BBC Radio 4's Today programme presenter Nick Robinson said Novara Media, along with other alternative media organisations, were involved in a "guerrilla war" on the BBC and mainstream media as part of an attack on what they saw as the establishment—and that this was undermining public trust in mainstream news outlets. Sarkar responded that Robinson had incorrectly identified the reasons people were losing trust in mainstream media, stating that the "political classes"—including the "establishment political media"—had been trying for a number of years to assure the public that they (i.e., the political classes) were "still responsible custodians of power, which after a disastrous intervention in the Middle East and a financial calamity people aren't feeling any more".

Staff and contributors

The list of contributors grew to include Ash Sarkar, Dalia Gebrial and Shon Faye. Michael Walker hosts Novara Live (previously TyskySour), the network's news and political live streams on its YouTube channel. By September 2017, Novara was run by a core team of 15 volunteers, and had about 200 paid contributing writers. The writers are external to the organisation.

Readership
A July 2015 interview with Jeremy Corbyn on the day he became the bookmakers' favourite to win the 2015 Labour Party leadership election attracted 60,000 views in its week of publication. Novara's self-reported site traffic statistics for the period of the 2015 UK general election were "modest": their election liveblog attracting 5,500 readers and their most popular election-related article 3,700 readers. This increased during the 2017 general election: the Novara website received a quarter of a million hits; their videos on Facebook received 2.3 million views; and on the day of the election Novara reached 1.2 million people via Facebook.

Along with other left-wing UK media outlets founded in the early 21st century, Novara Media's growth was in part due to a lack of trust, on the part of people in the UK who identify as left-wing, in mainstream media organisations. Novara's readership is typically 18 to 30-year-olds and left-leaning people dissatisfied with more traditional news outlets.

Responses
In 2015, the Institute for Public Policy Research described Novara Media as "innovative" within a "narrowed ... media landscape" that needed further reform as part of the UK's "architecture of democracy" to ensure "that all voices are heard in the political system".

2018 Poppy appeal
Bastani attracted controversy in November 2018 for his position on the poppy appeal, an annual fundraising campaign run by the Royal British Legion for veterans of the British armed forces. In an episode of Novara Media podcast "The Bastani Factor", Bastani described the poppy appeal as having a "racist" and "white supremacist" feel because, in his opinion, the appeal "has a kind of triumphalist militarism to it". The comments attracted widespread criticism in the national media, including from the Labour Party's Shadow Defence Secretary, Nia Griffith, who suggested Bastani should be expelled from the Party.

2021 YouTube deletion
On 26 October 2021, Novara Media's YouTube channel was deleted without explanation, and Novara called on YouTube to reinstate it. YouTube initially claimed that Novara had violated the platform's community standards without specifying the offenses. On 29 October, the social media platform reinstated Novara's channel and apologised, stating that they had made the "wrong call" after a member of the public incorrectly flagged the channel for spam. In response, advocacy group Big Brother Watch, Chief executive Ed Proctor of the Independent Monitor for the Press, and Novara contributor Ash Sarkar criticised YouTube for online censorship. Libertarian journalist and columnist Brendan O'Neill opined that Novara Media was a victim of the "cancel culture" that he argued the left had helped create. Both O'Neill and James Bloodworth of the New Statesman pointed out that in 2020, Gary McQuiggin, Novara's head of video, defended Twitter's right as a private company to remove accounts.

References

External links

 
British political websites
Internet properties established in 2011
2011 establishments in the United Kingdom
Left-wing politics in the United Kingdom
British news websites
Alternative journalism organizations
United Kingdom journalism organisations